The Battle of Hafr al-Batin (1929) was one of the last major battles of the Ikhwan revolt. The Ikhwan had already suffered a massive defeat at the Battle of Sabilla on March 29, and another defeat at the Battle of Jabal Shammar in August.

The battle consisted of a surprise night attack against the Ikhwan positions.

After the battle, the Ikhwan would attempt a raid on Awazim, but their forces had no fight left in them. In January of 1930, the remaining Ikhwan leaders would surrender to British forces.

References 

1929 in Asia
Hafr al-Batin
Conflicts in 1929
Ikhwan